Nick Willing (born 1961) is a British director, producer and writer of films and television series.

Early life

Willing is the son of Portuguese painter Dame Paula Rego and English artist Victor Willing and was largely brought up in Portugal, but settled in England at the age of 12, after the family suffered a business collapse.  In 2017 he directed a television film, Paula Rego, Secrets & Stories, about his mother, featuring his two sisters and  his brother-in-law, Australian sculptor, Ron Mueck.

He graduated from The National Film and Television School in 1982 and started directing music videos for bands such as Eurythmics, Bob Geldof, Swing Out Sister, Debbie Gibson, Kirsty MacColl, Kim Appleby, Tony Banks, and Nik Kershaw.

Throughout this period he was also writing screenplays, and in 1996 his adaptation of the Steve Szilagyi  novel Photographing Fairies was financed by PolyGram Filmed Entertainment and made into a feature film. Photographing Fairies was a critical success and won several awards including the Méliès d’Or in 1998.

Alice in Wonderland followed with a cast which included Whoopi Goldberg, Ben Kingsley, Robbie Coltrane, Martin Short, Peter Ustinov, Gene Wilder, Ken Dodd, Christopher Lloyd, George Wendt and Miranda Richardson. Alice was made for NBC television in 1999 and won 4 Primetime Emmys.

Director filmography 
1997 – Photographing Fairies
1999 – Alice in Wonderland
2000 – Jason and the Argonauts
2002 – Close Your Eyes a.k.a. Doctor Sleep and Hypnotic
2004 – Sea of Souls
2005 – The River King
2006 – Jackanory, The Magician of Samarkand and Muddle Earth
2007 – Tin Man
2009 – Alice
2011 – Neverland
2013 – Baby Sellers
2014 – Altar
2015 – Olympus
2017 – Paula Rego, Secrets & Stories
2019 – Unstoppable. Sean Scully & The Art of Everything

As writer 
Nick Willing wrote his first two movies Photographing Fairies and Doctor Sleep and went on to develop the short stories of H. G. Wells into a semi-biographical television series, The Infinite Worlds of H. G. Wells, which premiered in 2001. More recently he wrote the series Alice which received two Primetime Emmy Award nominations, and Neverland for the Syfy network and Sky Movies.

In 2014, he wrote the thriller Altar and created the 13-part series Olympus.

House of Stories 

In 2013, Nick stepped in to help negotiate an alternative contract for Casa Das Historias Paula Rego, the Cascais, Portugal museum dedicated to his mother’s work. As a consequence of the 2011–14 international bailout to Portugal by the European Union and the IMF, the Portuguese government closed several foundations, including Paula Rego's, leaving the museum in limbo. He now remains in an administrative role, representing his mother’s interests at the museum.

Interviews

References

External links 
 
 

Living people
English film directors
British people of Portuguese descent
Place of birth missing (living people)
English people of Portuguese descent
English television directors
Alumni of the National Film and Television School
People educated at Bryanston School
1961 births